The 1946 German Ice Hockey Championship consisted of two championships, the Bizone Championship and the German Championship. Both championships were unofficial, and there is no official German champion for 1946.

Bizone Championship

German Championship

References

External links
German ice hockey standings 1946-1958

Ger
German Ice Hockey Championship seasons
Champion